The Sacred Heart Cathedral also simply called Cathedral of Freetown, is a religious building that is affiliated with the Catholic Church and is located in the Howe street of the town of Freetown, capital and most populous city of the African country of Sierra Leone.

Construction
Work on its construction began in November 1884 and was dedicated on October 27, 1887.

It is a temple that follows the Roman or Latin rite and functions as the headquarters of the Metropolitan Archdiocese of Freetown (Archidioecesis liberae Urbis) which was created by Pope Paul VI by bull "Quantum boni". It is one of the four existing Catholic cathedrals in that nation being the other dedicated to the "Immaculate Heart of Mary" in Bo, to "St. Paul" in Kenema and of "Our Lady of Fatima" in Makeni.

It is under the pastoral responsibility of Archbishop Edward Tamba Charles.

See also
Roman Catholicism in Sierra Leone
Sacred Heart Cathedral (disambiguation)

References

Roman Catholic cathedrals in Sierra Leone
Churches in Freetown
Roman Catholic churches completed in 1887
19th-century Roman Catholic church buildings